2014 ACC tournament may refer to:

 2014 ACC men's basketball tournament
 2014 ACC women's basketball tournament
 2014 ACC men's soccer tournament
 2014 ACC women's soccer tournament
 2014 Atlantic Coast Conference baseball tournament
 2014 Atlantic Coast Conference softball tournament